Olivier Gruner (born 2 August 1960),  is a French former naval commando, actor, director, producer, screenwriter, martial artist, and pilot. Born in Paris, France, he moved to the United States in 1988. His career in the film industry began in 1987 when he first appeared at the Cannes Film Festival in France.

He has since appeared in over 40 films and four television series and is best known for his martial art and science fiction action films. Gruner is regarded as an "action hero" due to his portrayal of Alex Raine in Nemesis (1992), Lt. Sean Lambert in the Interceptor Force franchise (2000–2002), and of Dirk Longstreet in The Circuit franchise (2001-2006). He also played a role as Caution Templar in the film Mars (1997). 

His credits also include the urban action movie Angel Town (1989), Automatic (1994), Savate (1995), Mercenary (1996), Savage (1996), The White Pony (1999), Kumite (2000), Blizhniy Boy: The Ultimate Fighter (2007), Lost Warrior: Left Behind (2008), One Night (2010), and Beyond the Game (2016).

As a martial artist, Gruner was a full-time kick-boxer in France for 8 years from 1981 to 1988. He became France middleweight champion, then the middleweight full-contact kickboxing world champion in 1985, and again middleweight kickboxing world champion in 1986.

Early life and education 
Gruner was born the second of three sons to a French family of noted surgeons and engineers. As such, he was expected to pursue a traditional academic curriculum. Instead, he decided to be the black sheep of the family, with his family's support, and dedicate his life to the arts: martial arts at first, and then the 7th art.

At age 11, he saw a Bruce Lee movie and became captivated with martial arts and inspired by the film industry. As he was constantly being bullied at school, this pushed him to learn martial arts in order to defend himself. He began studying Shotokan karate, then boxing, kickboxing, and full contact kickboxing, which is essentially a mixture of Western boxing and traditional karate.

At age 18, he joined the French Navy, volunteering for their Commandos Marine unit, also nicknamed the Bérets Verts (Green Berets). That unit is reputed to be one of the toughest among the NATO Special Operation Forces, with a training attrition rate of 82%. The prospective Commandos in training are constantly under stress and pressure from instructors leaving them no respite.

All activities are timed and scored: marching tens of kilometres with equipment and weapon in all weathers, obstacle courses, and night navigation exercises. The training is punctuated by firearms training and assault tactics, climbing and rappelling, boat handling, sky diving and scuba diving, explosives instruction, and hand-to-hand combat, which is what Gruner learnt. During the training period, any mistake can instantly disqualify the candidates. The ultimate goal of this training is to detect individuals with the physical, intellectual, and psychological potential needed to serve in the Commandos Marine. Gruner was operational with the French Commandos Marine in Djibouti and Somalia, where he was involved in active combat, especially anti-piracy operations.

For Gruner, it was the occasion to forge himself the heart of a fighter for a forthcoming professional kick boxer career, and to learn the combat and discipline ropes necessary to be a credible action films actor, director, and producer. When he got out of the service, he had developed a sense of "never giving up" and was feeling in his mind that he was indestructible. This is how he has been capable to reproduce for the screen actual combat and fighting techniques, which he had learnt in real life as a Special Operation Forces Commando. This also explains some strange weapons seen in his movies, which are traditionally used by military special forces only, and therefore not usually shown in the film industry.

Career

1980s: Kickboxing 
In 1981 Gruner left the French military with the aim to train full-time in order to compete professionally as a kick boxer. He traveled to the French Alps and began an intensive training regimen. In order to pay for his training expenses, he had to hold down four jobs, as a bouncer, a ski patrol member, a martial arts trainer, and a ski lift operator.

This taught him the financial basics and philosophy of professional fighting. It is a business at the professional level, and winning or losing is not as important as it is for amateurs. For the pros, it is all about money. Sometimes a guy with as many "loses" as "wins", but who fights in an entertaining way, will make more money than an undefeated fighter... this wisdom would be key for him to learn how to manage properly the ups and downs of a film industry career, which is cyclical by nature.

In 1984, he began fighting as a professional kick-boxer. On that same year, after 10 professional fights only, he became France middleweight champion. By 1985, his successes in the ring were allowing him to train and fight full-time. In 1986, he became World Middleweight Kickboxing Champion.

Kickboxing titles

1984 Middleweight kickboxing France champion
1985 Middleweight full contact kickboxing world champion  -75 kg at W.A.K.O. World Championships in Budapest
1986 Middleweight kickboxing world champion

Having achieved in 6 years his dream of becoming a world champion, he retired from professional kickboxing in 1987 and made the leap from athlete to actor. Gruner perception is that as soon as one reaches the top in a discipline, the only way forward is downwards. So once he had become world champion, he decided it was time to explore something else. Following the lead of Reg Park and Arnold Schwarzenegger, he chose to move on to the movie industry and become a movie star.

In a very pro-active way, he did some serious self-promotion at the 1987 Cannes Film Festival. He plastered posters of himself around Cannes, which caught the attention of a producer. Days later, Gruner was flying to Los Angeles to do some screen tests. He passed those tests with a flying 74% and his next stop was the beginning of a film career.

1990s: Acting 
Gruner joined Imperial Entertainment Corporation (Turner Classic Movies - TCM) and began acting in action movies. Along the years, he has developed a reputation as a hard working and disciplined Hollywood actor. During this time, he has been frequently appearing in martial arts magazines, such as Budo Journal, Combat, Impact, Inside Karate, Inside Kung Fu Yearbook and many more.

In 1989 he starred in his first movie; the urban action movie Angel Town. For a first timer Gruner did an admirable job, and was immediately recognized by the critics for his presence, as well as his martial arts abilities, being compared to the likes of Dolph Lundgren, Jean-Claude Van Damme, and Steven Seagall.

In 1992, Gruner starred again as "Alex Raine" in Albert Pyun’s cyberpunk 1992 science fiction thriller Nemesis. The critics appreciated that Nemesis was filled with amazing stunts, thrilling action sequences, and innovative special effects that were pushing at the time the film industry limits of Blade Runner and Terminator 2. Both Nemesis and Angel town have been extremely popular in video, and Nemesis is one of the movies Gruner is most proud of. In this movie, he offers action, drama, fighting, and gunfights and had to drop down to a 4% body fat to be at his peak physically.

In 2010, Gruner acted as "Corsair Duguay" in Tales of an Ancient Empire, also named Abelar: Tales of an ancient Empire. In this movie, he had the pleasure to be reunited with Albert Pyun, his mentor in Nemesis.

Gruner has also played roles in Automatic (1994), Savate aka The Fighter (1995), Mercenary (1996), Savage (1996), Mars (1997), T.N.T. (1997), Mercenary 2:Thick & Thin (1998), Interceptor Force (1999), Velocity Trap (1999), The White Pony (1999), Crackerjack 3 (2000), Kumite (2000), G.O.D. (2001), Extreme Honor (2001), The Circuit (2001), Power Elite (2002), Interceptor Force 2 (2002), The Circuit 2: The Final Punch (2003), Deadly Engagement (2003), SWAT: Warhead One (2004), Crooked (2005), The Circuit 3: the street Monk (2006), Blizhniy Boy: The Ultimate Fighter (2007), Lost Warrior: Left Behind (2008), Skorumpowani (2008), Brother's War (2009), One Night (2010), Tales of an Ancient Empire, also named Abelar: Tales of an ancient Empire (2010), Re-Generator (2011), Cyborg: Rise of the Slingers (2013), Sector 4: Extraction (2014), EP/Executive Protection (2015), The whole World at our Feet (2015), Assassin X also named The Chemist (2016), Beyond the Game (2016), Showdown in Manila (2016), Darkweb (2016), Iron Cross: The road to Normandy (2018), and Amour (2019).

Gruner has been announced as "Jagger" in Escape from Paradise (2019), and as "Duguay" in Cyborg Nemesis: The dark Rift (2019), as well as in The Target (2019).

2000s: Television 

Already in 1999, Gruner appeared as "Dieter Vanderval" in the episode titled Wildlife of a television series named Martial Law.

In 2001, he appeared multiple times as "Tawrens" in 26 episodes of the television series Code Name: Eternity.

In 2005, NBC contracted Gruner for producing a TV series named The Pros, a way of life. This was a project that Gruner himself had started in videos since 2003. It shows what happens behind the scene, and the life, training, and discipline of professional athletes. He had already done episodes on boxers, surfers, and MMA fighters, when NBC finally decided to shelve the TV series, and it was never published by them. A video published by Gruner is available.

He was also contracted to play "Ivan" in the television series Seven Days published in 2019.

2010s: Directing 

Gruner first involvement as a director was in 2002 with Interceptor Force 2.

In 2011, he premiered his first feature film as a screenwriter, a director, and an actor, entitled Re-Generator. This name is the re-titling of a film previously called One Night, on which Gruner had been working since 2010.

In 2014 he featured as a director in Sector 4: Extraction, a direct-to-video release.

In 2015, Gruner released one more film as a director, a producer, a screenwriter, and an actor: EP/Executive Protection.

Film producing 

Rather early in his career, Gruner got involved in the production of some of the films in which he was appearing as an actor. This is the case for Savage (1996), Mercenary (1996), Mercenary 2: Thick & Thin (1998), Interceptor Force (1999), The Circuit (2001), and Crooked (2005).

But it is only starting from the 2010's, at the exception of Interceptor Force 2 in 2002, that he accumulated his involvement both as a producer, as an actor, and as a director in One Night (2010), Re-Generator (2011), Sector 4: Extraction (2014), and EP/Executive Protection (2015).

He has also been involved as a producer only in Front line (2015). And he was both an actor and a producer in Iron Cross: The road to Normandy (2018).

Screenwriting 
Gruner has had quite a taste for screenwriting and co-writing the stories of some of the movies in which he appeared as an actor.

He wrote the stories of T.N.T. (1997), Interceptor Force 2 (2002), Crooked (2005), One Night (2010), Re-Generator (2011), and EP/Executive Protection (2015).

He also co-wrote the story and the screenplay of Lost Warrior: Left Behind (2008), and co-wrote the story of Sector 4: Extraction (2014).

Business activities 

Gruner has always been involved with a number of other business activities, which also take up part of his time. He actually considers that it is wise to keep various sources of revenues generation, when one is involved in the film industry, which is very cyclical. This has allowed him to compensate for financial down times, when he was not actively involved in a movie as an actor, director, or producer.

Body-guarding 

Gruner occasionally does body-guarding for celebrities. It can be more comfortable for some clients to have a fellow star, who understands stardom's pressure and demands, that also fulfills the role of a bodyguard. Gruner indeed not only has got one of the highest special forces military training one can receive, but also provides body-guarding training at his academy. One of such body-guarding clients is the famous Canadian singer Celine Dion.

Training videos 

Gruner has been producing training videos for martial arts, combat skills, body-guarding, and survival techniques since 2012. He commercializes those under the various brands of "Gruner Tactical Training Academy" and "O.G Training". More recently, he has been producing a survival reality show video series under the name "Survival X" in 2018.

Personal training 

Gruner has always kept a side activity as a personal trainer in various martial arts such as kickboxing and mixed martial arts. He usually dedicates this personal training time to competing martial artists, as well as retired champions.

Athletic fashion brand 

He has also created his own "O.G" trademark athletic fashion brand. Several collections were produced, including "The Lone Operator" collection, and the "Pro Series" collection in 2018.

Helicopter piloting 

Gruner is a licensed helicopter pilot, which allows him to mix this activity with film producing requirements at times. For example, he worked for ABC News in Los Angeles where he did many chase videos, and saw a lot of damages and lethal encounters. Moreover, he was also the helicopter co-pilot in the 1999 movie Storm.

He regularly flies helicopters and considers it a big part of his life. For Blue Hawaiian Helicopters, he regularly flew tours on Hawaii Big Island. For Maverick Helicopters, he also flew tours over the Grand Canyon.

Personal life 

Gruner lives in Santa Monica, California and Las Vegas, Nevada. He has one son.

Otherwise, Gruner is a high energy person, who likes outdoor hobbies that require a lot of physical activity. He is frequently hiking, climbing, skiing, surfing, ballooning, sky diving, and scuba diving. As a perfectionist, he likes to practice what he shows in his movies, so his acting flows naturally, as he can show that he is actually doing the "real thing".

He has been regularly maintaining his karate, boxing and kickboxing training, which he has been completing with Brazilian jiu-jitsu, wrestling and mixed martial arts. He does enjoy regularly practicing 3 to 4 hours per day with the UFC guys, as it also makes him conversant in most martial arts, and keeps him fit. Gruner considers that this allows him thereafter to be a better actor and director in his movies, as far as such martial arts are concerned.

He has been regularly practicing at the shooting range or in remote nature, and he is a licensed NRA instructor. This keeps his shooting skills sharp for both his body-guarding activities, and his training videos. Moreover, he has been a volunteer fireman since 2015, and has enjoyed the training there as well as the charitable act of giving back to society.

Gruner does appreciate the lessons and wisdom of discipline. He practiced it through his military training and career, and his kickboxing training and career. He nowadays constantly practices it through his acting, directing, producing, as well as through his martial arts training, helicopter flying, and revenue sources diversification.

Filmography

Films

Television

Documentaries

Stunts

See also

 List of French actors
 List of French directors
 List of male kickboxers

References

External links 

 Olivier Gruner official website
 

1960 births
Living people
Military personnel from Paris
French expatriate male actors in the United States
People from Hollywood, Los Angeles
Male actors from Paris
Male actors from Hollywood, Los Angeles
Male actors from Los Angeles
Male actors from Santa Monica, California
Male actors from Greater Los Angeles
Film producers from California
Screenwriters from California
Film directors from Los Angeles
Science fiction film directors
French male karateka
Shotokan practitioners
French male kickboxers
Middleweight kickboxers
French male mixed martial artists
World middleweight boxing champions
French Navy personnel
Sportspeople from Paris
Commercial aviators
French aviators